Death diving is a form of extreme freestyle diving from heights jumping with stretched arms and belly first, landing in a cannonball or a shrimp position. The roots of Death Diving are in Norway where Døds events still dominates (see Døds Diving). The World Championship has taken place in Oslo Norway every August since it debuted in 2008. The World Championship is performed from a platform of 10-15 meters in height. 

There are two classes of death diving: Classic and Freestyle. 
In the Classic event, competitors are to fly horizontally with their arms and legs extended until they hit the water, with no rotations Competitors curl into a fetal position just before entering the water, landing first with their feet and hands or knees and elbows to avoid serious injury; dives are judged on speed, air time, complexity, how long the diver holds the original pose, the closing and the splash. 
In Freestyle, the competitors do various tricks during the air travel, including rotations and flips, hence the name. 

The current world record in height is 31.3 meters and is held by three competing athletes: Ken Stornes (No), Tore Våge (No) and Côme Girardot. In the women's class the record is at 24.8 meters and is set by Norwegian Asbjørg Nesje.

Døds World Championship winners (Men) 
 2008 Christian Kjellmann
2009 Fredrik Amundsen
2010 Vladimir Jevtic
 2011 Thord Samuelsen
 2012 Henning Marthinsen
 2013 Filip Julius Devor
 2014 Filip Julius Devor
 2015 Filip Julius Devor
 2016 Truls Torp
 2017 Truls Torp
 2018 Emil Lybekk
 2019 Kim André Knutsen
 2020 Emil Lybekk
 2021 Kim-Andre Knutsen
 2022 Leo Landrø

World Championship winners (Women) 
 2018 Miriam Hamberg
 2019 Miriam Hamberg
 2020 Ingrid Eriksen Bru
 2021 Asbjørg Nesje
 2022 Asbjørg Nesje

References 

Diving (sport)
Pages containing links to subscription-only content